I'm Not Bossy, I'm the Boss is the tenth full-length album by Irish singer-songwriter Sinéad O'Connor, released on 11 August 2014 on Nettwerk Music Group. The album was originally to be called The Vishnu Room after the song of the same name, but was changed, along with its original cover design, shortly before release in support of the Ban Bossy campaign.

The album was nominated for the Irish Meteor Choice Music Prize for Best Album.

Critical reception 

Upon release the album received positive reviews from such publications as American Songwriter, The Guardian, Now and Slant Magazine. The Metacritic aggregate score on August 12, 2014 was 66 out of a 100. Fred Thomas, writing for AllMusic, gave the album 3.5 stars out of 5, with a favorable review, opening with the summary: "A decade of inconsistent, spotty, or simply confusing output from iconic Irish singer/songwriter Sinéad O'Connor was redeemed with 2012's refreshingly focused and honest effort How About I Be Me (And You Be You)? That album saw O'Connor effortlessly creating the same type of emotionally charged yet easily melodic fare that constituted her earliest, most popular work, and positioned her for a graceful return to form. Two years later, I'm Not Bossy, I'm the Boss follows the impassioned pop framework of its immediate predecessor, branching out into even more vivid stylistic dimensions and retaining all the energy, controversy, and fire that have come to define O'Connor as both a musician and a political figure. Taken at face value, the songs here are vibrant and multifaceted."

Track listing
All lyrics written by O'Connor.

Personnel
Sinéad O'Connor – vocals, guitar on tracks 2, 3 and 5, bass guitar on track 13
John Reynolds – drums, keyboards, programming
Clare Kenny – bass guitar
Graham Kearns, Justin Adams – guitar
Graham Henderson, Tim Oliver – keyboards
Brook Supple – acoustic guitar
Tim Oliver, Brian Eno – keyboards
Rubert Cobb, Fred Gibson – trumpet
Caroline Dale – cello
Seun Kuti – saxophone
Ruby Reynolds – piano

Charts

References

2014 albums
Sinéad O'Connor albums
Nettwerk Records albums